Moumita Tashrin Nodi (born 13 September), better known as her nickname  Nodi, is a Bangladeshi playback singer.

Early life and education
Nodi was born into a musical family in Rajshahi, Bangladesh. When she was three years old, She began playing music and received classical training from her teacher and mother. After finishing her SSC and HSC. She shifted from Rajshahi to Dhaka to pursue her higher studies, In 2015. She is doing Bachelor study in English at Independent University, Bangladesh.

Career
Nodi took part in the 2010 Channel I Shera Kontho contest. She went on to become 2nd Runner-up. Later in 2013, she published her first studio album 'Mugdhota' which became a major success. She has worked on so many mixed albums, playbacks, drama songs and her solo projects. In 2013, she released her first music video 'Mugdhota' which is still very popular and remarkable work of her. In 2015, she released her first solo self titled album 'Nodi' which was also a very remarkable album in her musical career. She worked with ten different lyricists and nine music directors in the album. After that, she has sung in films and albums in 2016. The same year, she released 'Khunshuti' , a music video in Valentine's Day, which is a classical modern fusion song. In January 2018, she recorded a single 'Aaj Harai' with veteran singer Asif Akbar. She published her next album in Valentine's Day, 2018. She has published several studio albums. She playback for the movie PoraMon 2 song 'Suto Kata Ghuri' duet with Akassh which is very popular on YouTube. She is mostly known for as a regular stage performer, playback artist.

Personal life
Nodi has two elder brother's. and her father Md. Golam Mortoza is an engineer, businessman. her mother is a government officer.

Discography

Albums
 Nodi
 Mugdhota

Singles

Awards and nominations
 2004 : "Notun Kuri" / 1st-Champion 
 2009 : Jatiyo Rabindra Shangeet Shommelon, Chhayanot / First Class First
 2nd Runner-up – "Channel I Shera Kontho" – 2009
 2013 : Babisas Award 2013-14 / Popular Singer
 2014 : AJFB star award / Best female singer
 2014 : 12th Shako telefilm music award- / jury board choice best female singer

References

External links
 
 Nodi on soundcloud

21st-century Bangladeshi women singers
21st-century Bangladeshi singers
Living people
People from Rajshahi District
1995 births